is a double A-side single released by singer and cellist Kanon Wakeshima. It is Kanon's third single, and first single for her album Tsukinami. "Foul Play ni Kurari" was used as an ending theme song for the anime To Love-Ru Darkness, and "Sakura Meikyuu" was used as the theme song for the game Fate / Extra CCC. The song peaked at number 35 on the Oricon Singles Chart and stayed on the chart for four weeks.

Track listing

Personnel
 Kanon Wakeshima – vocals, cello, piano, lyrics

References 

2012 singles
2012 songs
Kanon Wakeshima songs
Warner Music Japan singles
Anime songs